The 1999 NCAA Division I Men's Golf Championships were contested at the 61st annual NCAA-sanctioned golf tournament for determining the individual and team national champions of men's collegiate golf at the Division I level in the United States.

The tournament was held at the Hazeltine National Golf Club in Chaska, Minnesota.

Georgia won the team championship, the Bulldogs' first NCAA title.

Luke Donald, from Northwestern, won the individual title.

Qualifying
The NCAA held three regional qualifying tournaments, with the top ten teams from each event qualifying for the national championship.

Individual results

Individual champion
 Luke Donald, Northwestern (284)

Team results

Finalists

Eliminated after 36 holes

DC = Defending champions
Debut appearance

References

NCAA Men's Golf Championship
Golf in Minnesota
NCAA Golf Championship
NCAA Golf Championship
NCAA Golf Championship